Abel Alier Kwai (born June 23, 1933) is a South Sudanese politician and judge who served as Vice President of Sudan between 1971 and 1982 and as President of the High Executive Council of the Southern Sudan Autonomous Region between 1972 and 1978. After Sudan gained independence from the United Kingdom in 1956, Southern Sudan was not left as an independent state. This led to a deadly war a year before the independence. A party in the war was Anyanya 1 Under Joseph Lagu. Abel Alier was a politician who managed to complete his college education among many Southern Sudanese. He is an internationally respected judge, human-rights lawyer and activist on behalf of Christians in the Sudan. Former Vice President of Sudan (1971–1982), he served as the first president of the High Executive Council of Southern Sudan. He sits on the Permanent Court of International Arbitration in The Hague and is recognized as Sudan's most prominent Christian lawyer. His latest book is Southern Sudan: Too Many Agreements Dishonoured.

Early years, 1933–1972 
Alier was born in June 1933 in the Bor District of the Upper Nile State in the then Anglo-Egyptian Sudan (the region where he was born is now part of South Sudan). He attended the renowned Rumbek Secondary School, which educated many South Sudanese leaders. He also attended the Wad Saina School in northern Sudan. He graduated from Law School of University of Khartoum and has his own law firm prior to his appointment as magistrate, becoming the first Sudanese judge of southern origin. He was active in the Southern Front since its foundation in 1964 and was in of its representatives at the Round Table Conference in 1965. He was elected to the National Parliament from 1968 to 1969 for Bor South constituency. He subsequently held several ministerial positions in the Sudanese government.

Addis Ababa Agreement of 1972 
In 1972 a peace agreement was signed in Addis Ababa, Ethiopia. Abel Alier became instrumental in that agreement which permitted Southern Sudan to have its own autonomous government in Juba. Abel Alier became a Vice President of Sudan when Numeiri was the president. Mr. Abel Alier is from the southern part of Dinka Bor. He is older than the late charismatic leader Dr. John Garang. Abel Alier never joined the Southern rebellion, but he has often been instrumental in helping negotiate a peaceful settlement between The North and Southern Sudan.

In 2005 he headed the committee that was appointed to investigate the death of Dr. Garang when he left Uganda for Sudan. Dr. John Garang died in a plane crash and Mr. Abiel Alier with the team did their part to investigate the possible mechanical failure that led to the crash which was regionally blamed on a bad weather and lack of clear visibility although the Ugandan President Yoweri Museveni hinted that the possibility of a foul play was something that shouldn't be dismissed or disregarded.

Sudan peace deals 
In early 1990s, Abel Alier wrote a book under the title Southern Sudan: Too Many Agreements Dishonored. The agreement signed in Ethiopia in 1972 was dishonored by Numeiri in 1983 when he announced the introduction of the Islamic Law.

In early 1997 Dr. Riek Machar, signed an agreement with Khartoum. It is referred to as "The Khartoum Agreement". It was never implemented. Mr. Alier's book was about such agreements and the failure to implement them. The recent peace deal between The South and North of Sudan is known as "The Comprehensive Peace Agreement" (CPA). This is the agreement that was signed by the late leader and Vice-President Dr. John Garang before his death on the July 30, 2005. The international community including the United States, Great Britain, EU countries and The United Nations along with the African IGAD have supported this agreement and it is likely to succeed after the six years of interim government known today as the government of The National Unity.

References

External links 
 Book
 Southern Sudan Politicians

Living people
Vice presidents of Sudan
South Sudanese judges
Presidents of South Sudan
South Sudanese writers
1933 births
People from Upper Nile (state)